The Mexico City Metro is the largest and busiest heavy-rail rapid transit system in Mexico and second in North America, only behind the New York City Subway.

, the system is composed of 12 lines denominated 1 through 9, 12, A and B, totalling  of track length and 195 stations. Of all stations, 115 are underground (either in shallow box-tunnels or deep circular tunnels), 54 are at street-level and 26 are elevated.

Line 1: Observatorio – Pantitlán

Line 1's Chapultepec - Zaragoza section was the first of the system to be opened, on September 4, 1969. The line was brought to its current length on August 22, 1984 with its final extension from Zaragoza to Pantitlán.

Line 1 runs mostly in a shallow box-tunnel just a few meters below the street, except for its initial stretch from Observatorio to Tacubaya, where it starts at street-level and progressively goes down to a deep circular tunnel through Tacubaya, where the box-tunnel begins. Line 1 is served by MP-68, NM-83 and NE-92 trains, built in France, Mexico and Spain in 1968, 1983 and 1992, respectively.

Transfer with other Metro lines is available at Tacubaya (lines 7 & 9), Balderas (line 3), Salto del Agua (Line 8), Pino Suárez (line 2), Candelaria (line 4), San Lázaro (line B) and Pantitlán (lines 5, 9 & A). Transfer to the Metrobús bus rapid transit (BRT) system is available at Tacubaya (line 2), Insurgentes (line 1), Cuauhtémoc (line 3), Balderas (line 3), Pino Suárez (line 4) and San Lázaro (lines 4 & 5).

Line 2: Cuatro Caminos – Tasqueña

Line 2 was the second line in the system to open, in 1970. The line has a general northwest–south direction passing through the city center and its color is blue. It starts at the border of the Federal District and the State of Mexico and ends in the city south.

It commutes with line 7 at Tacuba, line 3 at Hidalgo, line 8 at Bellas Artes, line 1 at Pino Suárez, lines 8 and 9 at Chabacano and line 12 at Ermita. At Tasqueña it links with the Mexico City Light Rail to Xochimilco. It used to be served by NC-82 and some NM-83 trains.

Line 2 was the scene of the worst accident in the Mexico City Metro's history on October 20, 1975, when a crash occurred between two trains at Viaducto Station. One train was parked at the station picking up passengers when it was hit by another train that did not stop in time. Twenty people were killed and several wounded. After that accident, automatic traffic lights were installed in all the lines.

Thirteen stations run underground while the remaining ten are surface stations. The line is currently served by NM-02 trains built in Mexico in 2004.

Line 3: Indios Verdes – Universidad

The first section of line 3 was opened in 1970. The line has a general north–south direction passing through the western end of downtown Mexico City and its color is olive green.

It is built under Insurgentes, Guerrero, Zarco, Balderas, Cuauhtémoc, Universidad, Copilco and Delfín Madrigal avenues. It commutes with line 6 at Deportivo 18 de Marzo, line 5 at La Raza, line B at Guerrero, line 2 at Hidalgo, line 1 at Balderas, line 9 at Centro Médico and line 12 at Zapata.

Most of the stations (17) run underground with the remaining four, including both terminals, being surface stations.

Line 4: Santa Anita – Martín Carrera

The line has a general north–south direction and is located east of the city center and its color is aqua. It is also the line with the lowest passenger flow, which is why the STC introduced modified 6-wagon trains. In the original blueprint, this line was planned to extend to the north all the way to Ecatepec, Mexico State.

Line 4 is the only one in the system that does not have underground sections. Eight of the ten stations are built on an elevated viaduct and the remaining two are surface stations.

Line 4 connects with line 1 at Candelaria, line 6 at Martín Carrera, line 5 at Consulado, line 8 at Santa Anita, line 9 at Jamaica and line B at Morelos.

Line 5: Politécnico – Pantitlán

The line has a general north-west to south-east direction relative to the city center and its color is yellow. This line previously had the NM73 trains but due to the introduction of the NM-02 trains in Line 2 now it is served by NC-82 Canadian trains made by Bombardier. Line 5 runs to Mexico City International Airport (Terminal Aérea station).

Line 5 has four underground and nine surface stations. Five stations connect with other metro lines.

Line 6: El Rosario – Martín Carrera

Line 6 had its first section inaugurated in 1983. This line has a west–east direction running north of the city center and its color is scarlet red.

The line has only one surface station, the El Rosario terminal, while the rest of the line runs underground. Four stations connect with other metro lines. Line 6, like line 4, is also served by customized six-car trains.

Line 7: El Rosario – Barranca del Muerto

The first section of line 7 was opened to the public in 1984. Line 7 has a north–south direction running west of the city center and its color is orange.

The line has its only surface station in the El Rosario terminal. The rest of the line runs underground, with some sections being located more than 20 m below street level, making it the deepest line in the system at a maximum of 36 meters. Three stations connect with other metro lines.

This line used MP-68 trains and a small number of NM-73, after the rehabilitation of some MP-68. They kept circulating on this line although there is a slightly bigger number of NM-79 and NM-83 in this line. Today there are only retro adapted NM-73 and NM-83 models and some trains from the first model due to the introduction of the NM-02 in the Line 2. Currently the MP-68 trains from Line 9 are being reintroduced.

Line 8: Garibaldi / Lagunilla – Constitución de 1917

Line 8 was the next to last route of the network to be opened, on July 20, 1994 by then President Carlos Salinas de Gortari and then regent of the city, Manuel Aguilera Gómez. Construction plans for the line date back to much earlier, but they were put on hold due to significant redevelopment. Line 8 runs in a general south-east direction, beginning near the city center, and its color is bright green.
The line has 14 underground stations and five surface stations, including the southern terminal Constitución de 1917. Six stations connect line 8 with other metro lines.
According to the Sistema de Transporte Colectivo, the volume of people moved in this line was 117,386,342 persons in 2006.

Line 9: Tacubaya – Pantitlán

The first section of line 9 was opened to the public in 1987. The line was opened to relieve passenger traffic from line 1, to which it runs parallel south of the city center. The color of the line is dark brown.

Line 9 has eight underground stations with the remaining being elevated stations similar to those in line 4, including the terminal Pantitlán. It is the only line in the system in which no section of the track runs at street-level. Additionally, five stations connect with other metro lines.  The trains of this line are made up from MP68 trains rehabilitated with fans and intelligent control systems and some NM-79 rolling stock.

Some of the stations were the set for the 1990 film Total Recall.

Line A: Pantitlán – La Paz

Line A was the second metro line that extended into the suburbs of Mexico City outside the Mexican Federal District. Line A runs in a general south-east direction, east of the city center, and its color is purple.

Line A has only one underground station, the terminal Pantitlán, while the rest of the line runs at street-level, sometimes going underground between stations. Only one station makes connections with other metro lines.

Until Line 12's opening, 21 years later (in 2012), line A was unique within the system in its use of traditional rail traction (steel-wheeled rolling stock) as opposed to pneumatic traction (rubber-tyred rolling stock).  Because it was the first line of this type in the metro system, it was called the Metro Férreo and sometimes continues to be referred to by that name. The line is served by FM-86 trains, built in Mexico by Concarril in 1986, and FM-95A trains, also built in Mexico (by Bombardier) between 1998 and 1999, which draw electricity through a pantograph. And also FE-07 CAF trains that were made in 2009.

Line B: Buenavista – Ciudad Azteca

Line B became the third line to extend into the suburbs of Mexico City. Line B starts north of the city center and runs in a general north-east direction relative to it. Its color is green on silver.

Six stations of line B run under ground, four are elevated and 11 run at street-level. Five stations connect with other metro lines.

All the trains are MP68 modified and equipped with GPS and intelligent control system, the trains in this line were the leftovers from Line 1 that were rehabilitated by Bombardier-Concarril.

Line 12; línea del Bicentenario: Mixcoac – Tláhuac

Construction of line 12 began after a public consultation, on August 8, 2007, and inaugurated on October 30, 2012. Although the line offered full service during the first 16 months of operation (Mixcoac - Tláhuac), the service over the eleven easternmost stations was suspended indefinitely due to structural failures, with provisional terminal being Atlalilco as of October 2014. For the 18 months of the repair works, Line 12 ran from Mixcoac to Atlalilco, (9 stations), 4 of them linking with other lines, as well as with the Mexico City Metrobús.

According to the Mexico City Metro website, line 12 trains use traditional rail traction (as line A). This means it would be the second metro férreo, this could have been called line C but the reasons for numerical naming (which also implies lines A and B are 10 and 11 respectively) does not allow it, because the parameters of this series, imply that the lines designated with letters instead of numbers are because those lines intersect areas of Mexico State (another entity of the country, adjacent to Mexico City). Government nicknamed it the línea del Bicentenario, commemorating the 200th anniversary of the beginning of Mexican War of Independence on September 16, 1810 and promising to deliver all twenty stations by April 30, 2012. However, delays on train deliveries and construction caused full operation was delayed to October 30, 2012. At that date, President Calderón and Mayor Marcelo Ebrard opened the line to service.

In March 2014, 11 stations had to be closed because of security risks for the passengers because of rail corrugation. An investigation determined rails were incompatible with the trains, accusations of corruption arose. After 18 months line was repaired and resumed service.

On the night of May 3, 2021, an elevated portion collapsed causing 26 deaths and 70 injuries.

See also
 Servicio de Transportes Eléctricos

References

Government of the Mexican Federal District (2005). Metrobús-Proyecto. Last retrieved February 22, 2006.
Monroy F., Marco A. (2004)  PDF map showing station type (Internet Archive link). Last retrieved February 25, 2006.
Red de Transporte de Pasajeros del Distrito Federal (2005). Red de Rutas por Zona.-RTP. Last retrieved February 23, 2006.
Servicio de Transportes Eléctricos del Distrito Federal (2003). Servicios.- Servicio de Transportes Eléctricos del D.F. Last retrieved February 22, 2006.
Sistema de Transporte Colectivo (2005). Página del Sistema de Transporte Colectivo. Last retrieved February 22, 2006.

External links
Map of the metro network in Google Earth - Google Earth is required to open this file.
UrbanRail.Net page on the Mexico City Metro - Contains a general description of the system as well as a table showing the chronological order in which all sections of the system have been opened.

 
Lines
Mexico City metro stations
Metro lines